Juurusvesi–Akonvesi is a lake in Finland. It consists of two basins, Juurusvesi in west and Akonvesi in east. The town of Siilinjärvi is located on the western extremity of Juurusvesi. Kuopio Airport is located on a peninsula jutting into Juurusvesi.

See also
List of lakes in Finland

References

LJuurusvesi-Akonvesi
Lakes of Kuopio
Lakes of Siilinjärvi